Albert Edward Moore (born 1863, date of death unknown) was an English footballer who played in The Football League for Notts County.

Early career
Albert Moore was born in the last quarter of 1863 and grew up in Nottingham in the East Midlands of England. He came to the attention of Notts County when he was in his late teens and signed for them during the Winter of 1881–1882. He made his debut in a friendly match against Sheffield on 6 February 1883. In the pre-Football League era Moore played 71 friendly matches, scoring 20 goals. He made his F.A. Cup debut on 24 January 1885 at The Chuckery, Walsall against Walsall Swifts. County won 4–1. In the pre-Football League era Moore played in 14 FA Cup ties scoring five goals, including a Hat-trick against Lincoln Ramblers on 15 October 1887.

1888–1889 season
Albert Moore, playing as one of the two forward', made his League debut on 15 September 1888 at Anfield, the then home of Everton. Notts County lost to the home team 2–1 and Albert Moore scored Notts County' goal becoming the first Notts County player to score a League goal. Albert Moore appeared in 10 of the 22 League matches played by Notts County in season 1888–89 and scored three goals. As a forward (nine appearances as a forward) Moore played in a forward line that scored three–League–goals–or–more on four separate occasions.

1889 onwards

Moore left the club and retired from football (as far as the records show) early in 1889.

Life After football

Nothing is recorded as to what Moore did after he left Notts County and there is no record of his death. It is possible that he left the United Kingdom and died abroad. However, that is speculation.

References

1863 births
English footballers
Notts County F.C. players
English Football League players
Year of death missing
Association football forwards